Kandola Kalan is a village in Nurmahal.  Nurmahal is a sub tehsil and tehsil is Phillaur in the city Jalandhar of Indian state of Punjab.

About 
Kandola Kalan is almost 1 km from Nurmahal.  The nearest Railway station to Kandola Kalan is Nurmahal Railway station.

Post code & STD code 
Kandola Kalan's Post code and STD code are 144039 & 01826 respectively.

References

  Official website of Punjab Govt. with Kandola Kalan's details

Villages in Jalandhar district